This is a timeline of Jodrell Bank Observatory.

1930s 
 1939 — Jodrell Bank site purchased by the University of Manchester as a botany field station.

1940s 

 1945, December — Bernard Lovell arrives at Jodrell Bank with several trailers of radar equipment from World War II.
 1947 — The 66 meter Transit Telescope is constructed.

1950s 

 1950, August — The transit telescope is used to make the first detection of radio waves from the nearby Andromeda Galaxy.
 1950 — Charles Husband presents first drawings of the proposed giant, fully steerable radio telescope.
 1952, September — Construction of the Mark I telescope begins.
 1957, October — The Mark I telescope becomes operational. It tracks the carrier rocket of Sputnik 1; the only telescope in the West able to do so.

1960s 
 1960, May — Lord Nuffield pays the remaining debt on the Mark I and the observatory is renamed the Nuffield Radio Astronomy Laboratories.
 1962 — As part of a radio-linked interferometer, the Mark I identifies a new class of compact radio sources, later recognised as quasars.
 1962 — Jodrell Bank radio telescope is mentioned in the science fiction novel A for Andromeda by Fred Hoyle and John Elliot.
 1964 — The Mark II telescope is completed.
 1966 — The Mark I receives pictures from Luna 9, the first spacecraft to make a soft landing on the Moon.
 1966 — The Mark III telescope is completed.
 1968 — The Mark I confirms the existence of pulsars.
 1968 — The Mark I took part in the first transatlantic VLBI experiment in 1968, with other telescopes being those at Algonquin and Penticton in Canada.
 1969 — The Mark I is used for the first time in a VLBI observation, with the Arecibo radio telescope in 1969.

1970s 
 1970–1971 — The Mark I is repaired and upgraded; it is renamed to the Mark IA.
 1972–1973 — The Mark I carries out a survey of radio sources; amongst these sources was the first gravitational lens, which was confirmed optically in 1979.
 1976, January — storms bring winds of around 90 mph which almost destroy the telescope. Bracing girders are added.

1980s 
 1980 — The Mark IA is used as part of the new MERLIN array.
 1982 — The 42 ft telescope is built, to replace the 50 ft.
 1986 — The first pulsar in a globular cluster is discovered.
 1986 — The Mark II telescope is given a new surface that is accurate to 1/3 mm.
 1987 — The Mark IA is renamed the Lovell Telescope after Bernard Lovell.

1990s 
 1990 — The new 32 m Cambridge telescope at Mullard Radio Astronomy Observatory is added to the MERLIN array.
 1992 — The MERLIN array becomes a national facility.
 1993 — At the request of NASA, the Lovell Telescope searches for the Mars Observer spacecraft.
 1998 — The Lovell Telescope begins participation with the SETI Project Phoenix

2000s 

 2000, February — The Lovell Telescope searches for NASA's Mars Polar Lander.
 2000 — Placebo recorded the video for The Bitter End at Jodrell Bank.
 2000–2002 — The Lovell Telescope is resurfaced, increasing its sensitivity at 5 GHz by a factor of five.
 2003, December — The Lovell Telescope searches for the Beagle 2 lander on Mars.
 2004, January — Astronomers from Jodrell Bank, Australia, Italy and the U.S. discover the first known double pulsar.
 2004 — Minor scenes for the film of the Hitchhiker's Guide to the Galaxy are filmed at Jodrell Bank.
 2005, February — Astronomers using the Lovell Telescope discovered a galaxy that appears to be made almost entirely of dark matter.
 2005, March — Jodrell Bank becomes the centre of the World's largest scale model of the Solar System as part of the Spaced Out project.
 2006, September — Jodrell Bank wins the BBC's online competition to find the UK's greatest "Unsung Landmark".

2010s 
 2011, March — Jodrell Bank is included on the UK Tentative List for nomination as a UNESCO World Heritage Site
 2019, July — The observatory becomes a UNESCO World Heritage Site.

References

Books 
 
 
 
 

Jodrell Bank Observatory
Jodrell Bank Observatory